

Women's 100 m Butterfly - Final

Women's 100 m Butterfly - Semifinals

Women's 100 m Butterfly - Semifinal 01

Women's 100 m Butterfly - Semifinal 02

Women's 100 m Butterfly - Heats

Women's 100 m Butterfly - Heat 01

Women's 100 m Butterfly - Heat 02

Women's 100 m Butterfly - Heat 03

Women's 100 m Butterfly - Heat 04

100 metres butterfly
2006 in women's swimming